Karl Henrik Lous (14 April 1847 – 10 October 1928) was a Norwegian barrister.

Personal life 
Lous was born in Christiania to Johan Christian Vogelsang Lous and Charlotte Sofie née Maschmann. He was married to Karoline Mathilde Zetlitz from 1874. He was the father of astronomer Kristian Lous, and of barrister and businessperson Georg Lous.

Career 
Lous graduated as cand.jur. in 1870, and was barrister with access to work with the Supreme Court from 1874. He served as Attorney General of Norway from 1904 to 1916. He was decorated Knight, First Class of the Order of St. Olav in 1890.

References

1847 births
1928 deaths
Lawyers from Oslo
Mayors of Oslo
Conservative Party (Norway) politicians